Sejad Krdžalić (born January 5, 1960 in Doboj) is a retired javelin thrower from Yugoslavia, who finished in twelfth place at the 1988 Summer Olympics in Seoul, South Korea. He set his personal best (83.34 m) on 30 May 1987 in Belgrade.

International competitions

References
 

1960 births
Living people
People from Doboj
Yugoslav male javelin throwers
Bosnia and Herzegovina male javelin throwers
Olympic athletes of Yugoslavia
Athletes (track and field) at the 1984 Summer Olympics
Athletes (track and field) at the 1988 Summer Olympics
World Athletics Championships athletes for Yugoslavia
Universiade medalists in athletics (track and field)
Athletes (track and field) at the 1987 Mediterranean Games
Mediterranean Games gold medalists for Yugoslavia
Mediterranean Games medalists in athletics
Universiade silver medalists for Yugoslavia
Medalists at the 1987 Summer Universiade